Correos y Telecomunicaciones de Guinea Ecuatorial also known by its alias of Gecotel, is the public operator responsible for postal service in Equatorial Guinea. Arsenio Esono Afang is the director.

See also
 Communications in Equatorial Guinea

References

Companies of Equatorial Guinea
Equatorial Guinea
Communications in Equatorial Guinea